Muncy Bank Ballpark at Historic Bowman Field is a minor league baseball stadium in Williamsport, Pennsylvania, in the United States. It is home to the Williamsport Crosscutters, a collegiate summer baseball team of the MLB Draft League. The official seating capacity is 2,366. Opened in 1926, Bowman Field is the second-oldest ballpark in minor league baseball.  Bowman Field was also the home field for the Wildcats of the Pennsylvania College of Technology for more than a decade through the 2021 baseball season.

Since 2017, Bowman Field has been used for a regular-season Major League Baseball (MLB) game, the MLB Little League Classic, held each August during the Little League World Series.

In 2012, Airmen Pond, an outdoor ice hockey rink, was built at Bowman Field. It served as home ice for the Williamsport Outlaws of the Federal Hockey League until the team folded in January 2013.

History

Ballparks in Williamsport before Bowman Field
Williamsport has hosted minor league baseball since the late 19th century. The various teams played at differing sites in Williamsport. The earliest ballfield was near the West Branch Susquehanna River. It has long since been replaced by a levee and U.S. Route 220, U.S. Route 15 and Interstate 180. A second and more permanent facility was built in the Vallamont neighborhood. Cochran Elementary School sits on the former site of the ballpark. The Williamsport Bills and later Williamsport Grays played the seasons at Williamsport High School's athletic field on West 3rd Street. It too is long since gone; this property is currently home of the Pennsylvania College of Technology.

Construction and opening
Bowman Field was completed in 1926 to host the city's entry as an original franchise in the New York–Pennsylvania League called the Williamsport Grays. The Grays were a charter member of the New York–Pennsylvania league which was established in 1923. Two of the most important boosters and financial backers of the team were J. Walton Bowman for whom the stadium was named and Thomas Gray, the Lycoming County sheriff, for whom the Grays were named.

The Grays had previously been playing their home games on the athletic field of Williamsport High School. This facility proved to be much too small. A larger and more permanent stadium was needed. A group of civic leaders and baseball boosters lead the drive to construct a new stadium for the Grays on the western side of Williamsport on the banks of Lycoming Creek. An agreement between the Grays and the city was reached in July, 1925 to build what was then known as Memorial Field, which was named for the municipal park in which it is located. J. Walton Bowman headed an 11-member holding company that financed and managed the construction of the ballpark at a cost of $75,000 (equivalent to $ in ). Ground was broken in the fall of 1925 and the stadium opened in time for the beginning of the 1926 New York–Pennsylvania League season.

The original dimensions of Bowman Field were quite large compared to the dimensions of modern baseball fields. Another unusual feature of the stadium was a terrace that was located on left field near the fence.

The first game to be played at Bowman Field took place on April 22, 1926, when the Grays hosted the team of nearby Bucknell University in an exhibition. The first professional opponent to appear at Bowman Field was the Harrisburg Colored Giants. The Grays lost two games to the Giants on April 27 and 29. The first New York–Pennsylvania League game took place on May 4. The Grays beat the Shamokin Indians 5-1.

Names
Bowman Field was known as Memorial Field from 1926 until 1929. It was renamed on June 26, 1929, to honor J. Walton Bowman. Bowman was the president of the Grays at the time and instrumental in the effort to fund and construct the stadium. He was additionally honored by the players of the team with a Swiss watch and his granddaughter was given the honor of hoisting a pennant in center field bearing the name "Bowman Field".

In April 2021, under a naming rights agreement between the city of Williamsport and Muncy Bank & Trust, the ballpark's name was changed from BB&T Ballpark at Historic Bowman Field to Muncy Bank Ballpark at Historic Bowman Field. The six-year contract is free for the first year and earns the city $32,500 annually after that.

Eastern League
The Eastern League was at Bowman off and on for nearly 70 years. The Williamsport Grays started play in 1926 in Bowman Field. The final Eastern League team to call the park home was the 1991 Williamsport Bills. That team moved to Binghamton, New York, the next season and became the Binghamton Mets.

The Grays began playing in the forerunner of the Eastern League, the old New York–Pennsylvania League in 1923. The Class B league was made entirely of teams from New York and Pennsylvania. It kept this name until 1938 when the Scranton Miners move to Hartford, Connecticut. Williamsport was a member of the league for 46 years between 1923 and 1991. The teams were known as the Grays, Tigers, A's, Mets, Tomahawks and Bills. Williamsport had affiliations with the Philadelphia A's for three periods, Pittsburgh Pirates, Detroit Tigers, Washington Senators, Philadelphia Phillies, New York Mets,  Cleveland Indians for two separate periods, and Seattle Mariners.

The Phillies played a mid season exhibition game at Bowman Field on July 31, 1962, when the team lost to the Williamsport Grays, the Phillies' Eastern League affiliate.

The potato incident
Dave Bresnahan was catching for the 1987 Williamsport Bills, who were in seventh place in an eight-team league, playing the last-place Reading Phillies in late-August game. With a runner on third base, Bresnahan switched catcher's mitts and put on a glove in which he had secreted a shaved-down potato. When the pitch came in, Bresnahan fired the white potato down the third-base line, enticing the runner to sprint home. Bresnahan then tagged the runner with the baseball, prompting the umpire to award the runner home plate for Bresnahan's deception, even though he clearly had been tagged out with the ball.

The president of the Eastern League took offense to what he perceived as Bresnahan's affront to the game, banning the grandnephew of Hall of Famer Roger Bresnahan from the league. However, the citizens of Williamsport applauded Bresnahan for his ingenuity, eventually prompting the club to retire his number 59. At the retirement ceremony in 1998, Bresnahan was quoted as saying, "Lou Gehrig had to play in 2,130 consecutive games and hit .340 for his number to be retired, and all I had to do was bat .140 and throw a potato."

New York–Penn League
For the 1994 season, baseball returned to Bowman with the New York–Penn League's Williamsport Cubs.  The club became the Crosscutters, a Pittsburgh Pirates farm team, in 1999.  Significant stadium upgrades took place prior to the 2002 season.  The club became a farm team of the Philadelphia Phillies in 2006. In conjunction with Major League Baseball's reorganization of the minors after the 2020 season, Williamsport left the New York–Penn League and became a collegiate summer baseball team of the newly created MLB Draft League, which is a showcase for draft-eligible players.

Ice hockey–Federal Hockey League

On July 24, 2012, Williamsport mayor Gabriel J. Campana announced that the Williamsport Outlaws of the Federal Hockey League (FHL) would play their 2012–2013 season at an outdoor ice rink built at Bowman Field. The Outlaws were the FHL champions their previous (and first) season, which they played in Wayne, New Jersey, as the "New Jersey Outlaws". On August 1 the Crosscutters and Outlaws agreed to terms regarding restoration of the baseball diamond after the removal of the ice rink at the end of the hockey season, though beer sales at Outlaws games were still an issue (as the Crosscutters hold the liquor license for the stadium). Construction of the ice rink, named Airmen Pond after a local sponsor, began in early October. The rink was also open for public skating and use by local amateur teams.

The  ice rink officially opened on October 18, and the first home game of the Outlaws' 60-game season on October 24 drew over 3,000 fans, an FHL record. Williamsport Ice Arena, a local non-profit group headed by FHL commissioner Don Kirnan, operated the ice rink and rented it to the Outlaws and other users. In November 2012, the non-profit filed an injunction seeking to prevent the rink's builder, Rink Specialists of Naples, Maine, from repossessing it for late payments; both sides alleged breach of contract. The FHL All Star Game was scheduled to be played at Bowman Field on January 2, 2013.

Renovation project
On May 26, 2016, Mayor Gabriel Campana, Peter Freund, Crosscutters principal owner, Crosscutters staff, and other stakeholders broke ground for a first base deck where fans can interact while enjoying food and refreshments. This deck is part of a $3 million project to upgrade one of the oldest baseball parks in the country. The newly announced renovations are being made possible by a $1.25 million RACP Grant by the state. , the renovation decreased the capacity to 2,366.

MLB Little League Classic

On March 9, 2017, Major League Baseball announced that the first MLB Little League Classic would take place on August 20 of that year, during the Little League World Series. In a statement, Commissioner of Baseball Rob Manfred said that the league's "greatest responsibility is to ensure that today’s youth become active participants in our game as players and fans." The St. Louis Cardinals and the Pittsburgh Pirates were selected to play in that game. Tickets to the game were reserved for those involved in the Little League World Series, as well as a limited number of residents of Lycoming County on a lottery basis. The game was televised by ESPN as its weekly Sunday Night Baseball game. Over the last few weeks before the game, the field was renovated to conform to MLB's standards.

Championship teams
Bowman Field has been the home to four championship teams.
1934 Grays, New York–Pennsylvania
1960 Grays, Eastern co-champions
2001 Crosscutters, New York–Penn co-champions
2003 Crosscutters, New York–Penn

References

External links
Williamsport Crosscutters
Bowman Field Views - Ball Parks of the Minor Leagues
Official New York–Penn League Website
Photographs of Historic Bowman Field - Rochester Area Ballparks
Baseball Reliquary's Exhibit of the Bresnahan potato

Minor league baseball venues
Sports venues in Pennsylvania
Baseball venues in Pennsylvania
Williamsport Crosscutters
Buildings and structures in Williamsport, Pennsylvania
Tourist attractions in Lycoming County, Pennsylvania
Sports in Williamsport, Pennsylvania
1926 establishments in Pennsylvania
Sports venues completed in 1926